Rod Roberts (born October 22, 1957) is the Iowa State Labor Commissioner.  Roberts is also a former Republican gubernatorial candidate and five-term Iowa State Representative from the 51st and 80th Districts. He served in the Iowa House of Representatives from 2001 to 2011 and was an assistant minority leader. He received his BA from Iowa Christian College, as did his wife.

During his last term in the Iowa House, Roberts served on the Administration and Rules, Appropriations, Local Government, State Government, and Transportation committees. His political experience includes serving on the Carroll School Board from 1996 to 2000. Other experience includes serving as past president of the Carroll Rotary Club and serving on the Board of Directors for New Hope Village (a facility supporting disabled adults) in Carroll.

Early and personal life
Rod Roberts was born in 1957 to parents, Jack Roberts, a history teacher and Darlene Roberts, a bank teller. He grew up in Zearing, and was highly influenced by Ronald Reagan. Roberts and his wife, Trish, moved to Carroll in 1985.

Electoral history
Roberts ran for the Iowa House's District 80 in 1998, losing to incumbent Democrat James Drees. He ran again in 2000 and won the election, defeating Democratic opponent Thomas Halbur. After the districts were redrawn for the 2002 election, Roberts was elected to the new District 51. He did not seek re-election to the House in 2010, choosing to seek the Republican nomination for governor instead. He was defeated in the primary, coming in a distant third behind former governor Terry Branstad, who went on to win the general election, and Iowa businessman Bob Vander Plaats. At the Republican state convention, he declined when nominated for the Republican nomination for Lieutenant Governor, endorsing then-State Senator Kim Reynolds for the position.

Electoral history
*incumbent

References

External links

Representative Rod Roberts official Iowa General Assembly site
 
Profile at Iowa House Republicans

1957 births
Living people
People from Waverly, Iowa
Republican Party members of the Iowa House of Representatives
School board members in Iowa
People from Carroll, Iowa